Wuhan Yangtze River Football Club, formerly Wuhan Zall Football Club, is a defunct Chinese football club that participated in the Chinese Super League under licence from the Chinese Football Association (CFA). The team is based in Wuhan, Hubei and their home stadium is the Dongxihu Sports Centre that has a seating capacity of 30,000. Their current majority shareholder is the investment company Wuhan Zall Development Holding Co. Ltd.

The club was founded in 2009 after the withdrawal and then dissolution of its predecessor Wuhan Optics Valley from the league after the club had a dispute with the Chinese Football Association over their on-field behaviour. The Hubei Province soccer association decided to help form a new team with players mainly from the former Wuhan Optics Valley and Hubei youth teams. They entered at the start of the 2009 league campaign at the bottom of the professional Chinese football league pyramid in the third tier. The team won promotion to the 2013 Chinese Super League after coming runners-up in the 2012 China League One division and spent only one season in the top flight before being relegated back down. In 2018, the team won the League One again and earned their second season in the top flight. They stayed there until the 2022 Super League, where they were once again relegated to League One after finishing 16th.

On 25 January 2023, the club announced that it decided to withdraw its participation on any competition managed by the Chinese Football Association, which means the club has dissolved.

History

2009–2011: Hubei Luyin 
Hubei Luyin was founded in February, 2009 after its predecessor Wuhan Optics Valley withdrew from the top tier because of its controversial punishment in October 2008 after the club had a dispute with the Chinese Football Association over the club's on-field behaviour against Beijing Guoan in a 27 September 2008 league game. Due to their withdrawal they were unable to register and participate in any professional Chinese tournaments, however the Hubei Province football association decided that due to the lack of representation of any Hubei teams within the Chinese football league system they would help create a new team to represent Hubei and use the Wuhan U-19 team as well as the Hubei youth team as the foundation for the squad. This saw the establishment of a new football club on the 26 February 2009 when the Hubei Luyin officially registered itself within the Chinese Football Association and start at the bottom of the professional football system in the third tier. The club would show their unusual strength in depth when they would breeze through the regional section of the league campaign and enter into the play-off finals where they lost their only game of the season Hunan Billows F.C. in a penalty shoot out. Despite the defeat the club would win promotion to the second tier and to strengthen their team they bought back the contracts of several Wuhan Optics Valley players who were not permanently sold off.

2011–2018: Wuhan Zall 
With the club in the second tier they would go through a period of joint investment from several parties until 14 December 2011 saw the Zall Group take ownership of the club and rename them Wuhan Zall Football Club as well as changing the team's colours back to orange, which was the club's predecessor's main colours. Initially the new owners saw the team struggle throughout the 2012 league season and decided to sack the existing manager Jose Carlos de Oliveira and replace him with Zheng Xiong on a caretaker basis. As the season went on the results considerably improved under Zheng Xiong who was given a full-time contract before guiding Wuhan Zall to second within the league and promotion to the Chinese Super League. The club's start in the 2013 league season was not a success and when the team went six games without a win, Zheng resigned. The former Shandong Luneng Head coach who had won the Chinese Super League, Ljubiša Tumbaković was brought in to manage the team, however despite his experience in the league he was unable to help the club avoid relegation and he was sacked before the season was finished.
In 2015 the football club was sold to a private company Wuhan Zall Development Holding Co. Ltd. under the ownership of their chairman Yan Zhi and his relatives, for RMB 20,630,000.

2019-2022: Super League 
After several seasons within the second tier, the club brought in Li Tie as the Head Coach, a manager who had previously guided Hebei China Fortune F.C. to the top tier. In his debut season Li Tie was able to guide Wuhan to the victory of the division championship and promotion back into the Chinese Super League at the end of the 2018 league season.

During the 2022 season Wuhan Yangtze River F.C. lost 3-1 to Chengdu Rongcheng which resulted in Wuhan being relegated to China League One for the 2023 season. However, their participation on the League One did not happen, as the club dissolved at the start of 2023.

Name history 
2009–2010: Hubei Luyin F.C.
2011: Hubei Wuhan Zhongbo F.C.
2012–2020: Wuhan Zall F.C.
2021: Wuhan F.C.
2022: Wuhan Yangtze River F.C.

Retired numbers

8  retired for the legend, Yao Hanlin.

Managerial history

 Li Jun (2009–10)
 Li Xiao (2011)
 Jose Carlos de Oliveira (2011–12)
 Zheng Xiong (24 April 2012 – 21 April 2013)
 Ljubiša Tumbaković (22 April 2013 – 18 August 2013)
 Wang Jun (19 August 2013 – 10 December 2013)
 Dražen Besek (11 December 2013 – September 2014)
 Zheng Bin (September 2014 – 17 July 2015)
 Zheng Xiong (17 July 2015 – 26 June 2016)
 Ciro Ferrara (July 2016 – 20 March 2017)
 Tang Yaodong (30 March 2017 – 9 July 2017)
 Chen Yang (9 July 2017 – 10 November 2017)
 Li Tie (16 November 2017 – 2 January 2020)
 José Manuel González López (4 January 2020 – 24 September 2020)
 Pang Li (24 September 2020 - 27 December 2020)
 Li Xiaopeng (27 December 2020 - 3 December 2021)
 Li Jinyu (4 December 2021 - 25 January 2023)

Results 
As of the end of 2022 season.

All-time League Rankings

 in group stage
 Wuhan Yangtze River had 3 points deducted due to unpaid salaries on 5 November 2022 and had 6 points deducted due to unpaid salaries on 23 November 2022.
Key

 Pld = Played
 W = Games won
 D = Games drawn
 L = Games lost
 F = Goals for
 A = Goals against
 Pts = Points
 Pos = Final position

 DNQ = Did not qualify
 DNE = Did not enter
 NH = Not Held
 –  = Does Not Exist
 R1 = Round 1
 R2 = Round 2
 R3 = Round 3
 R4 = Round 4

 F = Final
 SF = Semi-finals
 QF = Quarter-finals
 R16 = Round of 16
 Group = Group stage
 GS2 = Second Group stage
 QR1 = First Qualifying Round
 QR2 = Second Qualifying Round
 QR3 = Third Qualifying Round

See also 
Wuhan Optics Valley F.C.

References

External links 
Wuhan Yangtze River at ESPN

 
Defunct football clubs in China
Chinese Super League clubs
Sport in Wuhan
2009 establishments in China
2023 disestablishments in China
Association football clubs established in 2009
Association football clubs disestablished in 2023